Another Kind is a collection of science fiction short stories by American writer Chad Oliver. It was issued in hardcover and paperback by Ballantine Books in 1955 and a German translation was issued in 1965. It was Oliver's first collection.

Contents
"The Mother of Necessity", (original)
"Rite of Passage", (Astounding 1954)
"Scientific Method", (Science-Fiction Plus 1953)
"Night", (If 1955)
"Transformer", (F&SF 1954)
"Artifact", (F&SF 1955)
"A Star Above It", (original)

"Scientific Method" was originally published as "Hands Across Space".

Reception
The New York Times reviewer Villiers Gerson faulted Oliver's "uniformly quiet, underwritten style," declaring the "cumulative effect" of the stories was "emotional monotony; too cerebral for more than mild entertainment, they are clever fugues written in a minor key." The Hartford Courant's George W. Earley praised Oliver's "excellent stories", saying he "has created some compellingly believable alien and earthly civilizations".

References

Science fiction short story collections
Ballantine Books books
1955 short story collections